The discography of Italian gothic metal band Lacuna Coil consists of nine studio albums, two extended plays, two live albums, two compilation albums, one video album, sixteen singles and sixteen music videos.

Albums

Studio albums

Live albums

Compilation albums

Video albums

Remix albums

Extended plays

Singles

Music videos

References

External links
 Lacuna Coil official site
 Lacuna Coil at AllMusic
 
 

Lacuna Coil
Heavy metal group discographies
Discographies of Italian artists